Stochastic electrodynamics (SED) is a variant of classical electrodynamics (CED) of theoretical physics. SED consists of a set of controversial theories that posit the existence of a classical Lorentz invariant radiation field having statistical properties similar to that of the electromagnetic zero-point field (ZPF) of quantum electrodynamics (QED).

Classical background field

The background field is introduced as a Lorentz force in the (classical) Abraham–Lorentz–Dirac equation (see: Abraham–Lorentz–Dirac force), where the classical statistics of the electric and magnetic fields and quadratic combinations thereof are chosen to match the vacuum expectation values of the equivalent operators in QED. The field is generally represented as a discrete sum of Fourier components each with amplitude and phase that are independent classical random variables, distributed so that the statistics of the fields are isotropic and unchanged under boosts. This prescription is such that each Fourier mode at frequency (f) is expected to have an energy of hf/2, equaling that of the ground state of the vacuum modes of QED. Unless cut off, the total field has an infinite energy density, with a spectral energy density (per unit frequency per unit volume) [2h/c3]f3 where h is Planck's constant. Consequently, the background field is a classical version of the electromagnetic ZPF of QED, though in SED literature the field is commonly referred to simply as 'the ZPF' without making that distinction. Any finite cutoff frequency of the field itself would be incompatible with Lorentz invariance.  For this reason, some researchers prefer to think of cutoff frequency in terms of the response of particles to the field rather than as a property of the field itself.

Brief history

Stochastic electrodynamics is a term for a collection of research efforts of many different styles based on the ansatz that there exists a Lorentz invariant random electromagnetic radiation. The basic ideas have been around for a long time; but Marshall (1963) and Brafford seem to have been the originators of the more concentrated efforts starting in the 1960s. Thereafter Timothy Boyer, Luis de la Peña and Ana María Cetto were perhaps the most prolific contributors in the 1970s and beyond.
Others have made contributions, alterations and proposals concentrating on the application of SED to problems in QED. A separate thread has been the investigation of an earlier proposal by Walther Nernst attempting to use the SED notion of a classical ZPF to explain inertial mass as due to a vacuum reaction.

In 2010, Cavalleri et al. introduced SEDS ('pure' SED, as they call it, plus spin) as a fundamental improvement which they claim potentially overcomes all the known drawbacks to SED. They also claim SEDS resolves four observed effects that are so far unexplained by QED, i.e., 1) the physical origin of the ZPF, and its natural upper cutoff; 2) an anomaly in experimental studies of the neutrino rest mass; 3) the origin and quantitative treatment of 1/f noise; and 4) the high-energy tail (~ 1021 eV) of cosmic rays. Two double-slit electron diffraction experiments are proposed to  discriminate between QM and SEDS.

In 2013 Auñon et al. showed that Casimir and Van der Waals interactions are a particular case of stochastic forces from electromagnetic sources when the broad Planck's spectrum is chosen and the wavefields are non-correlated. Addressing fluctuating partially coherent light emitters with a tailored spectral energy distribution in the optical range, this establishes the link between stochastic electrodynamics and coherence theory; henceforth putting forward a way to optically create and control both such zero-point fields as well as Lifshitz forces  of thermal fluctuations. In addition, this opens the path to build many more stochastic forces on employing narrow-band light sources for bodies with frequency-dependent responses.

In a 2014 dissertation Carlos Alberto de Oliveira Henriques measured the energy shift in the atomic levels of Xe atoms as they passed through nano-porous Casimir membranes. Some evidence of anomalous radiation were observed, however, he was not able to distinguish this radiation conclusively from the background due to said shortcomings in the detector. A follow up study detected anomalous radiation and was able to either eliminate various alternative sources of energy as an explanation or show that they were unlikely. The amount of radiation detected, however, was lower than expected.

Scope of SED
SED has been used in attempts to provide a classical explanation for effects previously considered to require quantum mechanics (here restricted to the Schrödinger equation and the Dirac equation and QED) for their explanation. It has also been used to motivate a classical ZPF-based underpinning for gravity and inertia. There is no universal agreement on the successes and failures of SED, either in its congruence with standard theories of quantum mechanics, QED, and gravity, or in its compliance with observation. The following SED-based explanations are relatively uncontroversial and are free of criticism at the time of writing:
The Casimir effect
The Van der Waals force
Diamagnetism
The Unruh effect

The following SED-based calculations and SED-related claims are more controversial and some have been subject to published criticism:

The ground state of the harmonic oscillator
The ground state of the hydrogen atom
De Broglie waves
Inertia
Gravitation
Non-locality and tests of Bell's theorem

Zero point energy
According to Haisch and Rueda, inertia arises as an electromagnetic drag force on accelerating particles, produced by interaction with the zero-point field.  In their 1998 Ann. Phys. paper (see citations), they speak of a "Rindler flux", presumably meaning the Unruh effect, and claim to have computed a nonzero "z.p.f. momentum".  This computation rests upon their claim to compute a nonzero "z.p.f. Poynting vector".

These proposals for zero-point energy suggest a source of low or no cost free energy from the vacuum as well as the hope of developing a reactionless drive. NASA continues to make assessments: In the usual interpretation of vacuum energy it is not possible to use it to do work.  However, SED takes a rather more literal, classical interpretation, and views the very high energy density of the electromagnetic vacuum as propagating waves, which must necessarily carry considerable energy and momentum flux, ordinarily not evident in the absence of matter, because the flux is isotropic.

Fictional references
Arthur C. Clarke describes a "SHARP drive" (for Sakharov, Haisch, Rueda and Puthoff) in his 1997 novel "3001: The Final Odyssey".

See also 

 Stochastic quantum mechanics

References

Further reading
 
  on-line version from Haisch's website
  physics/9802030
  gr-qc/0504061

External links
 California Institute for Physics and Astrophysics, a  physics organization founded by Bernard Haisch
 H. E. Puthoff, Quantum Vacuum Fluctuations: A New Rosetta Stone of Physics?
 H. E. Puthoff, Quantum Vacuum Fluctuations: A New Rosetta Stone of Physics?

Fringe physics
Quantum field theory
Emergence